Bader Al-Mutawa is a Kuwaiti professional footballer who has represented the Kuwait national football team as a forward since his debut in 2003. He is the third highest-scoring Kuwaiti footballer ever, having scored 56 goals. With 196 senior appearances, he is also the most capped active male footballer and the most capped ever after surpassing Malaysia's Soh Chin Ann.

Goals

Scores and results list Kuwait's goal tally first, score column indicates score after each Al-Mutawa goal.

Statistics

Notes

References

International goals
Al-Mutawa, Bader